Fredrik Holmlund (born August 7, 1989 in Södertälje, Sweden) is a Swedish musician, artist and singer-songwriter. He is best known for his work as the bass player for the Swedish singer Yohio

Biography and career 
Holmlund grew up in Södertälje and started singing and playing guitar in several Stockholm-based Rock- and punk bands.

In 2011 Holmlund started the hybrid-metal band DESAIHA and decided to switch the guitar for the bass since they didn't find anyone who was "good enough".

One year later he quit his job to focus on Desaiha. Shortly after they released their first demo "Wisteria" the band announced that they signed a management-deal with Yohio.

Holmlund was the bassist of Yohio in Melodifestivalen 2013.Heartbreak Hotel went straight to the final in the first round in Telenor Arena in Karlskrona februari 2, 2013. In the final, the song finished in second place with 133 points. The year continued with a tour with Yohio which ended in Stockholm where Gackt was a guest artist.

In 2014 he performed with Yohio again in Melodifestivalen with the song "To the End" which, yet again went straight to the final. The finale of Melodifestivalen 2014 was held in Friends Arena, where they finished in 6th place with 82 points.

In August 2014, Desaiha released their first, and only single "Castiel", which debuted at number one on the Swedish iTunes list. The single is the record label, KEIOS Entertainment's, first released song.

Desaiha split in early 2015 and Holmlund joined the band Marsh where he plays guitar and sings.

In March 2016, Yohio announced that he would move to Japan. On June 18 of that year Holmlund made his last gig with Yohio in Sweden.

Holmlund announced in April the same year via his website that during the summer he would record songs for his solo project Lazsarus.

On September 4, 2016, the Swedish rock band Kerbera announced via its Facebook page that Holmlund was the band's new bass player and that his first gig with the band would be at AniMaCo in Berlin

Holmlund announced via social media in November the same year that he was sponsored by Schecter Guitars

On June 16, 2017, Holmlund released his first song with Kerbera which also came in first on the iTunes list and was the 12th most downloaded song in Sweden. In conjunction with the release, fans were given the opportunity to unlock the associated music video by listening to the song. A feature that Holmlund coded.

In the fall of 2017 Holmlund together with Kerbera released the single 'Love Like a Loaded Gun' with accompanying video. The song came from Kerbera's debut album  People Like You .

In early January 2018 a new single named 'Circus' was announced which became Holmlund's fourth release with Kerbera. At the same time, Kerbera announced that they would be supporting Falling in reverse in Russia and that the band will release the first tour dates for 2018.

On March 20, 2018, Kerbera released the single "Howl" for charity and Holmlund announced via social media that it was the first song he wrote for Kerbera. All proceeds went in full to the organization "The Man That Rescues Dogs" and the band went on a three-week tour in Thailand. Howl also took home first place on the iTunes list. In August of that year, Holmlund announced that he would leave Kerbera. In September he joined the band on stage for a farewell concert where he sang the songs. Holmlund released his first single "Rise" under the pseudonym "Lazsarus" on September 18, 2018.

In early June 2019, Södertälje Stadsscen announced that a tribute concert for the game franchise Silent Hill would be held during the autumn. Holmlund plays guitar and since the franchise celebrates 20 years the composer Akira Yamaoka will be joining the band on stage. In October 2021 the concert was released for free on Youtube.

Band and projects 
 2010 Vanity
 2011–2015 Desaiha
 2013– Yohio
 2015 Marsh
 2016–2018 Kerbera
 2016– Lazsarus
 2019 Silent Hill: The Music

Discography

Filmography

References 

1989 births
Living people
Swedish male musicians
People from Södertälje